My Lord Conceit is a 1921 British crime film directed by F. Martin Thornton and starring Evelyn Boucher, Maresco Marisini and Rowland Myles.

Cast
 Evelyn Boucher as Beryl Foster  
 Maresco Marisini as Count Savona  
 Rowland Myles as Ivor Grant  
 E.L. Frewyn as Sir Hector Grant  
 Frank Petley as John Marsden  
 J. Edwards Barker as Dr. Clark  
 Emilie Nichol as Mrs. Grant  
 Eric George as Cyril  
 Thornton Edwards as Jackie  
 Coomarie Gawthorne as Matabia

References

Bibliography
 Goble, Alan. The Complete Index to Literary Sources in Film. Walter de Gruyter, 1999.

External links

1921 films
1921 adventure films
British silent feature films
British adventure films
1920s English-language films
Films directed by Floyd Martin Thornton
Films based on British novels
Stoll Pictures films
British black-and-white films
1920s British films
Silent adventure films